Orò Festival is an event celebrated by towns and settlements of Yoruba origin. It is an annual traditional festival that is of patriarchal nature, as it is only celebrated by male descendants who are paternal natives to the specific locations where the particular event is taking place. It worships the god/orisha, Orò, the Yoruba deity of bullroarers and justice. During the festival, females and non-natives stay indoors as oral history has it that Orò must not be seen by women and non-participating people. The ceremonies surrounding the celebration of Orò differ from town to town, and one is often called after the death of a monarch. When the Oba or other important official dies, a special atonement and period of mourning are held.

Orò is usually concealed except during the festivity. Orò makes an entrance by making high-pitched swishing sounds. This whirring sound is said to be made by the wife called Majowu.

The Orò festival has been argued to be anti-woman by some because of the requirement for women to stay indoors during the festival.Women must not come outside for the full day. It is believed that if any woman comes out, people will die.

During the festival, the voice or sound of Orò fills public spaces and private spaces as well, in the traditional belief blessing everyone who hears it.

The Orò festival is mentioned in D.O. Fágúnwà's 1954 novel Ìrìnkèrindó nínú Igbó Elégbèje (Expedition to the Mountain of Thought), where the mother of Olojumajele flees into the forest because she hears the sound of the Orò bullroarers both behind and ahead of her and is scared she might come face-to-face with the Orò spirit. Unbeknownst to her, there is no masquerade, just evil spirits of the forest imitating the noise of the bullroarers.

References

Yoruba culture
Cultural festivals in Nigeria
Yoruba festivals